Douglas v. Cunningham, 294 U.S. 207 (1935), was a United States Supreme Court case in which the Court held the Copyright Act of 1909 allowed an award of $5,000 instead of a copyright infringement damages calculation based on the newspaper's circulation.

References

External links
 

1935 in United States case law
United States Supreme Court cases
United States Supreme Court cases of the Hughes Court
United States copyright case law